Karstula is a municipality of Finland founded in 1867. It is located in the Central Finland region.

Neighbouring municipalities are Kannonkoski, Kivijärvi, Kyyjärvi, Saarijärvi and Soini.

There are all together 159 lakes in Karstula. Biggest lakes are Pääjärvi, Enonjärvi and Vahanka.

History 
The name of Karstula is likely derived from the Savonian surname Karstunen, encountered around Ristiina since 1541. First records of the surname in Northern Tavastia (modern Central Finland) are from the 18th century. Karstula was initially a part of the Saarijärvi parish, acquiring chapel rights in 1775 under it. Karstula was allowed to become a separate parish and municipality in 1858, but separated later in 1887. Kyyjärvi was a part of Karstula until 1929, though it only acquired a separate parish in 1944.

Suomenselkä municipality 
Karstula, Kivijärvi and Kyyjärvi accepted the merger proposal, but Kannonkoski did not. After Kannonkoski left out of the planned merger, Kivijärvi also left out. The merger project of the remaining Karstula and Kyyjärvi failed at the Kyyjärvi municipal council meeting held on May 17, 2021, and the Ministry of Finance does not propose a forced merger either.

Architecture 
 A number of historical buildings (from the beginning of the 20th century) has been preserved in the village centre, representing the original countryside buildings of the region.
 There's also a cottage designed by Alvar Aalto, though it is not listed in most Aalto's biographies.

Transport 
Highway 13 between Kokkola and Lappeenranta, main road 58 between Kangasala and Kärsämäki and main road 77 between Kyyjärvi and Siilinjärvi pass through the Karstula municipality.

Karstula is served by OnniBus.com route Helsinki—Jyväskylä—Kokkola.

Notable people
Artturi Koskinen (1904–1981), Member of Parliament
Jarmo Mäkinen (born 1958), actor
Nätti-Jussi (1890–1964), legendary lumberjack
Harri Koskinen (born 1970), designer

Culture
 The International Shooting Week

Twin cities
 Broby Municipality, Denmark
 Ragunda, Sweden
 Stjørdal, Norway

Gallery

References

External links

Municipality of Karstula – Official website 
Karstula official tourism site
The International Shooting Week

 
Municipalities of Central Finland
Populated places established in 1867